Coccidiphila riedli is a moth in the family Cosmopterigidae. It is found on the Canary Islands.

Adults have been recorded from February to April.

Larvae have been found between dead leaves of Ceballosia fruticosa. They possibly also feed on Plumbago capensis.

References

Moths described in 1986
Cosmopteriginae